The Nashville Noise was a short-lived member of the American Basketball League (ABL). The site was a sound one, capitalizing on the long-time success and well established fan support of the University of Tennessee's women's basketball program, and the team was anchored by former Tennessee All-American Michelle M. Marciniak and the 1996 Olympic gold-medal winner and native Tennessean Venus Lacy. However, after playing only 15 games in 1998, the team was forced to disband when, on December 22, 1998, the ABL suddenly ceased operating.

Team Record

American Basketball League (1996–1998) teams
Defunct basketball teams in the United States
Basketball teams established in 1998
Sports clubs disestablished in 1998
Sports in Nashville, Tennessee
Basketball teams in Tennessee
1998 establishments in Tennessee
1998 disestablishments in Tennessee
Women's sports in Tennessee